The ruble was the currency of Latvia from 1919 to 1922 and again from 1992 to 1993.

First ruble

After the proclamation of the Republic of Latvia in 1918, a great variety of different currencies were in circulation: ostrubels, ostmarks, papiermarks, the so-called Tsar rubles, the so-called Duma Money and Kerenkas, as well as promissory notes issued by several town municipalities.

On 4 February 1919, the Latvian Provisional Government authorized the Minister of Finance to issue the first currency notes of the Republic of Latvia: Treasury notes. They were denominated in rubles (Latvian: rublis, plural: rubļi or rubłı) and kopecks (Latvian: kapeika, plural nominative: kapeikas, plural genitive: kapeiku). On 27 March 1919 the exchange rates for the Latvian ruble were fixed at 1 ostmark, 2 papiermarks and 1.5 imperial rubles. Between April 1919 and September 1922, currency notes were issued in denominations of 5, 10, 25, and 50 kopecks and 1, 2, 5, 10, 25, 50, 100, and 500 rubles. No coins were issued.

The first state currency notes were printed in 1919 by Andrievs Niedra's government, which was considered pro-German and illegal, and was overthrown in the same year. The legal government of Kārlis Ulmanis printed quite similar notes but with different signatures on them. This government recognized the previously printed banknotes as legal tender. The designer of these banknotes was Jūlijs Madernieks.

On 3 August 1922, the Cabinet of Ministers approved the "Regulations on Money" which introduced the lats as Latvia's national currency, with one lats equalling 50 rubles. The ruble remained in circulation alongside the lats for a time.

Second ruble

Latvia's regained independence was recognized by the Soviet Union on 6 September 1991. In the first four months of 1992, the country was adversely affected by inflation of the Soviet ruble. In addition, outgoing cash payments exceeded incoming amounts by 122 million rubles (5.9%) in February, and by 686 million rubles (29.2%) in April, thus causing a serious shortage of cash.

Since the currency was issued by the Soviet Union, and by Russia after 20 December 1991, the Bank of Latvia was unable to increase the amount of cash circulating in the country; it was completely dependent on the availability of cash and credit from the Central Bank of Russia, the successor of the State Bank of the Soviet Union. It was evident that a crisis could develop by the end of May, when the Bank of Latvia would not be able to finance even the most necessary payments.

To resolve the problem, on 4 May 1992, the Monetary Reform Commission of the Republic of Latvia passed a resolution "On Introduction of the Latvian ruble". From 7 May 1992, a temporary currency, the Latvian ruble (LVR), was put into circulation as a legal tender parallel to the existing ruble notes. It was declared equal in value to the Soviet ruble. Latvian ruble notes (widely known as repšiki, after the then governor of the Central Bank, Einars Repše) were issued in denominations of 1, 2, 5, 10, 20, 50, 200, and 500 rubles.

Lats

The second Latvian ruble was withdrawn from circulation on 18 October 1993, but could be exchanged for lats until 1 July 1994, when it lost validity. and the historic national currency - the lats - was reintroduced in 1993, replacing the Latvian ruble at the ratio of 1 lats (LVL) = 200 rubles (LVR). On 1 January, 2014, lats was replaced by the euro at the rate of 0.702804 lats to 1 euro.

References 

Modern obsolete currencies
Economy of Latvia
Currencies of Latvia
1919 establishments in Latvia
1922 disestablishments in Europe
1992 establishments in Latvia
1993 disestablishments in Latvia
1993 in Latvia
1990s economic history